Acid rock is a loosely defined type of rock music that evolved out of the mid-1960s garage punk movement and helped launch the psychedelic subculture. Named after lysergic acid diethylamide (LSD), the style is generally defined by heavy, distorted guitars, lyrics with drug references, and long improvised jams.  Much of the style overlaps with 1960s garage punk, proto-metal, and early heavy, blues-based hard rock.

The term is sometimes used interchangeably with "psychedelic rock", but it also specifically refers to a more musically intense subgenre or sibling of the psychedelic rock style. Compared to other psychedelic rock, acid rock features a harder, louder, heavier, or rawer sound. It developed mainly from the American West Coast, where groups did not focus on the novelty recording effects or whimsy of British psychedelia, and instead emphasized the heavier qualities associated with both the positive and negative extremes of the psychedelic experience.

As the movement progressed into the late 1960s and 1970s, elements of acid rock split into two directions, with hard rock and heavy metal on one side and progressive rock on the other. In the 1990s, the stoner metal genre combined acid rock with other hard rock styles such as grunge, updating the heavy riffs and long jams found in acid rock and psychedelic-influenced metal.

Definitions

"Acid rock" as a term was initially (and often still is) loosely defined. In 1969, as the genre was still solidifying, rock journalist Nik Cohn called it a "fairly meaningless phrase that got applied to any group, no matter what its style". The term was originally used to describe the background music for acid trips in underground parties in the 1960s (e.g. the Merry Pranksters' "Acid Tests") and as a catchall term for the more eclectic Haight-Ashbury bands in San Francisco. The Grateful Dead's Jerry Garcia believed that acid rock is music you listen to while under the influence of acid, further stating that there is no real "psychedelic rock" and that it is Indian classical music and some Tibetan music "designed to expand consciousness".

The term has often been deployed interchangeably with "psychedelic rock" or "psychedelia", particularly during the genre's nascence. However, the distinction between the heavier “acid rock” and the more general or inclusive genre of “psychedelic rock” has been well established.  According to Per Elias Drabløs, "acid rock is generally considered a subgenre of psychedelic rock", while Steve and Alan Freeman state the two terms are more or less synonymous, and that "what is usually referred to as acid rock is generally the more extreme end of that genre". This would mean psychedelic rock that is heavier, louder, or harder.

When defined specifically as a hard rock variant of psychedelia, acid rock is distinguished as having evolved from the 1960s garage punk movement, with many of its bands eventually transforming into heavy metal acts. Percussionist John Beck defines "acid rock" as synonymous with hard rock and heavy metal. The term eventually encompassed heavy, blues-based hard rock bands. Musicologist Steve Waksman wrote that "the distinction between acid rock, hard rock, and heavy metal can at some point never be more than tenuous".

Origins and ideology

Many bands associated with acid rock aimed to create a youth movement based on love and peace, as an alternative to workaholic capitalist society. David P. Szatmary states, "a legion of rock bands, playing what became known as 'acid rock,' stood in the vanguard of the movement for cultural change." Szatmary also quotes from the San Francisco Oracle, an underground newspaper published between 1966 and 1968, to explain how rock music was perceived at that time and how the acid rock movement emerged: "Rock music is a regenerative and revolutionary art, offering us our first real hope for the future (indeed, for the present)."

When played live at dance clubs, performances were accompanied by psychedelic-themed light shows in order to replicate the visual effects of the acid experience. According to Kevin T. McEneaney, the Grateful Dead "invented" acid rock in front of a crowd of concertgoers in San Jose, California on December 4, 1965, the date of the second Acid Test held by author Ken Kesey. Their stage performance involved the use of strobe lights to reproduce LSD's "surrealistic fragmenting" or "vivid isolating of caught moments". The Acid Test experiments subsequently launched the psychedelic subculture. Author Steve Turner recognises the Beatles' success in conveying an LSD-inspired worldview on their 1966 album Revolver, especially with the track "Tomorrow Never Knows", as having "opened the doors" to acid rock. Former Atlantic Records executive Phillip Rauls recalls: "I was in the music business at the time, and my very first recognition of acid rock ... was, of all people, the Beach Boys and the song 'Good Vibrations' ... That [song's theremin] sent so many musicians back to the studio to create this music on acid."

According to Laura Diane Kuhn, the heavier form of psychedelic rock known as acid rock developed from the late 1960s California music scene. The Charlatans were among the first Bay Area acid rock bands, though Jefferson Airplane was the first Bay Area acid rock band to sign a major label and achieve mainstream success. By July 1967, Time magazine wrote, "From jukeboxes and transistors across the nation pulses the turned-on sound of acid-rock groups: the Jefferson Airplane, the Doors, Moby Grape". In 1968, Life magazine referred to the Doors as the "kings of acid rock".

Other bands credited with creating or laying the foundation for acid rock include garage rock bands such as the 13th Floor Elevators and Count Five. The blues rock group the Paul Butterfield Blues Band are also credited with spawning the harder acid rock sound, and their 1966 instrumental "East-West", with its early use of the extended rock solo, has been described as laying "the roots of psychedelic acid rock" and featuring "much of acid-rock's eventual DNA". The Beatles' June 1967 album Sgt. Pepper's Lonely Hearts Club Band was a major influence on American acid rock groups.

Development and characteristics

Evolution from garage bands

Originating in the early 1960s, garage punk was a mainly-American movement that involved R&B-inspired garage bands powered by electric guitars and organs. It was mainly the domain of untrained teenagers fixated on sonic effects, such as wah-wah and fuzz tone, and relied heavily on riffs. The music later blurred into psychedelia. American garage bands who began to play psychedelic rock retained the rawness and energy of garage rock, incorporating garage rock's heavy distortion, feedback, and layered sonic effects into their versions of psychedelic music, spawning "acid rock". Bisport and Puterbaugh, defining acid rock as an intense or raw form of psychedelia, include "garagey" psychedelia under the label of "acid rock" due in part to its "energy and intimation of psychic overload".

The earliest known use of the term "garage punk" appeared in Lenny Kaye's track-by-track liner notes for the 1972 anthology compilation Nuggets: Original Artyfacts from the First Psychedelic Era, 1965-1968, which prominently featured both acid rock and garage rock. Musicologist Simon Frith cites Nuggets as a showcase for the garage psychedelia of the 1960s and the transition between early 1960s garage rock and the more elaborate acid rock of the late 1960s. This acid rock present in the Nuggets anthology has been described as an offshoot of 1960s "punk rock". At the time, the term "punk rock" referred to the garage rock of the 1960s, such as that present in the Nuggets compilation. Bands such as Count Five, with their 1966 song "Psychotic Reaction", as well as other groups featured on Nuggets, would eventually epitomize the overlap between 1960s garage rock and psychedelic punk, or acid rock. As one of the first successful acid rock songs, "Psychotic Reaction" also contained the characteristics that would come to define acid rock: the use of feedback and distortion replacing early rock music's more melodic electric guitars.

Another group included on the Nuggets album, the 13th Floor Elevators, began as a straight garage rock band before becoming one of the original early acid rock bands and the innovators of psychedelic rock in general, with a sound consisting of distortion, often yelping vocals, and "occasionally demented" lyrics.  Their debut album, The Psychedelic Sounds of the 13th Floor Elevators, featuring the garage rock hit "You're Gonna Miss Me", was among the earliest psychedelic rock albums. By 1966, the New York City garage band the Blues Magoos were referring to their wailing blues rock as "psychedelic music", and their hard variant of psychedelic rock, with its roots in the garage movement, would be increasingly labeled "acid rock".

Distinctions from other psychedelic rock

Acid rock often encompasses the more extreme side of the psychedelic rock genre, frequently containing a loud, improvised, and guitar-centered sound. Alan Bisbort and Parke Puterbaugh write that acid rock "can best be described as psychedelia at its rawest and most intense ... Bad trips as well as good, riots as well as peace, pain as well as pleasure - the whole spectrum of reality, not just the idyllic bits, were captured by acid rock." "Acid rock" has also been described as more heavily electric and containing more distortion ("fuzz") than typical psychedelic rock. By the late 1960s, in addition to the deliberate use of distortion and feedback, acid rock was further characterized by long guitar solos and the frequent use of electronic organs. Lyric references to drug use were also common, as exemplified in Jefferson Airplane's 1967 song "White Rabbit" and Jimi Hendrix Experience's 1967 song "Purple Haze". Lyrical references to drugs such as LSD were often cryptic.

At a time when many British psychedelic bands played whimsical or surrealistic psychedelic rock, many 1960s American rock bands, especially those from the West Coast, developed a rawer or harder version of psychedelic rock containing garage rock energy. When contrasted with whimsical British psychedelia, this harder American West Coast variant of psychedelic rock has been referred to as acid rock. American psychedelic rock and garage bands such as the 13th Floor Elevators epitomized the frenetic, darker and more psychotic sound of American acid rock, a sound characterized by droning guitar riffs, amplified feedback, and guitar distortion. Hoffman writes that acid rock lacked the recording studio "gimmickry" that typified the more Beatles-influenced strain of psychedelic rock, though acid rock experimented in other ways with electrified guitar effects.

Tonal distortion was also one of the defining characteristics of the San Francisco Sound. The acid rock of the San Francisco Sound heavily incorporated musical improvisation, jamming, repetitive drum beats, experimental sound and tape effects, and intentional feedback. San Francisco acid rock generally took a non-commercial approach to song-writing: it often involved almost free jazz-like, free-form hard rock improvisations alongside distorted guitars, and lyrics often were socially conscious, trippy, or anti-establishment. Many of the musicians in the scene, including bands such as the Charlatans and the Quicksilver Messenger Service, became involved in Ken Kesey's LSD-driven psychedelic scene, known as the Merry Pranksters.

Transition to hard rock and heavy metal

Heavy metal evolved from psychedelic music and acid rock and added psychedelic/acid rock to the basic structure of blues rock. In the 1960s, the heavy, blues-influenced, psychedelic hard rock sound of bands such as the Jimi Hendrix Experience, Deep Purple, and Cream was classified as acid rock. Other acid rock groups such as Blue Cheer, Iron Butterfly, and Vanilla Fudge served as examples of early heavy metal, or proto-metal, creating stripped-downed, loud, intense, and "fuzzy" acid rock or hard rock. Bands such as Blue Cheer, Cream, and the hard rock group The Amboy Dukes have all been described as "leading practitioners" of the harder variant of psychedelic rock known as "acid rock". Many acid rock bands would subsequently become heavy metal bands.

The influence of acid rock was evident in the sound of heavy metal in the 1970s. Iron Butterfly's "In-A-Gadda-Da-Vida" is sometimes described as an example of the transition between acid rock and heavy metal or the turning point in which acid rock became "heavy metal". "In-A-Gadda-Da-Vida" serves a notable example of 1960s and early 1970s acid rock or heavy psychedelia, and the band would continue to experiment with distorted, "fuzzy", heavy psychedelia into the 1970s. Both Iron Butterfly's 1968 album In-A-Gadda-Da-Vida and Blue Cheer's 1968 album Vincebus Eruptum have been described as influential in the transition of acid rock into heavy metal. Heavy metal's acid rock origins can further be seen in the loud acid rock of groups such as Steppenwolf, who contributed their song "Born to Be Wild" to the soundtrack of the 1969 film Easy Rider, which itself glamorized the genre. Ultimately, Steppenwolf and other acid rock groups such as Cream, the Jimi Hendrix Experience, and Led Zeppelin paved the way for the electrified, bluesy sound of early heavy metal.

By the early 1970s, bands such as Deep Purple, Led Zeppelin and Black Sabbath combined the loud, raw distortion of acid rock with occult lyrics, further forming a basis for the genre now known as "heavy metal". At a time when rock music began to turn back to roots-oriented soft rock, many acid rock groups instead evolved into heavy metal bands. As its own movement, heavy metal music continued to perpetuate characteristics of acid rock bands into at least the 1980s, and traces of psychedelic rock can be seen in the musical excesses of later metal bands. In the 1990s, the stoner metal genre combined acid rock with other hard rock genres such as grunge, updating the heavy riffs and long jams found in the acid rock and psychedelic-influenced metal of bands such as Black Sabbath, Blue Cheer, Hawkwind, and Blue Öyster Cult.

In addition to hard rock and heavy metal, acid rock also gave rise to the progressive rock movement. In the 1970s, elements of psychedelic music split into two notable directions, evolving into the hard rock and heavy metal of Black Sabbath, Deep Purple, and Led Zeppelin on one side and into the progressive rock of bands such Pink Floyd and Yes on the other. Bands such as Yes, Pink Floyd, King Crimson, and Emerson, Lake, and Palmer kept the psychedelic musical movement alive for some time, but eventually moved away from drug-themed music towards experiments in electronic music and the addition of classical music themes into rock music.

List of artists

Footnotes

References

Bibliography

 
 
 
 
 
 
 
 
 
 
 
 
 
 
 
 
 

 
 
 
 
 
 
 

 

 
 
 
 

 

 
 
 
 
 
 
 
 
 

 
Psychedelic rock
20th-century music genres
1960s in American music
1960s neologisms
American rock music genres